Aguascalientes, officially the Free and Sovereign State of Aguascalientes, is one of the 32 states which comprise the Federal Entities of Mexico.

As of 2019, Aguascalientes has a population of 1.4 million inhabitants, most of whom live in its capital city, also named Aguascalientes. Its name means "hot waters" and originated from the abundance of hot springs originally found in the area. The demonym for the state's inhabitants is hidrocálido or aguascalentense.

Aguascalientes is one of the smallest states of Mexico, either by population or land, being the 27th most populated state and the 29th biggest state by area; nonetheless, it is the 4th state by population density, and its economic development in recent years have located it as the 7th state by Human Development Index and the 8th with highest GDP per capita.

Aguascalientes was historically known for its former railroad and textile industry, as well as wine making, an industry that remains today. During the 2010s Aguascalientes became the fastest-growing state in the country for the whole decade. Aguascalientes is also well known for its San Marcos Fair (Feria Nacional de San Marcos), the largest fair in Mexico and one of the largest in Latin America.

History
Pre-Columbian era arrowheads, potshards, and rock paintings in the caverns of the Sierra del Laurel and near the present village of Las Negritas testify to the presence of man in this territory for more than 20,000 years.   Later in the colonial times, Pedro Almíndez Chirino was the first Spaniard who entered the territory, perhaps by the end of 1530 or the beginning of 1531, following the instructions given by Nuño de Guzmán.

Before the arrival of the Spaniards, the territory of what is now the State of Aguascalientes was inhabited by Chichimecas, who made the territory difficult to access.   In fact, the total occupation of the lands of El Bajío was a task that would take about two centuries. With respect to this, Viceroy Luís de Velasco offered municipal benefits to those who established settlements to confront the Chichimeca. And for his part, Viceroy Gastón de Peralta decided to confront them directly, which did not end with good results.

It was in order to be in the territory that is presently the state inhabited by Chichimecas, the so-called Guachichiles, that the conquistadors built several forts or presidios.

This was a system devised by Martín Enríquez de Almanza following the strategy that had been developing in Spain throughout the Reconquista period. Therefore, in order to protect the Camino de la Plata, which stretched between Zacatecas and Mexico City, three presidios [garrisoned fortifications] founded by the Indian fighter Juan Domínguez, were to be created, which were: the presidio at Las Bocas, later called Las Bocas de Gallardo, situated on the border of Aguascalientes, in what was the jurisdiction of the mayor of Teocaltiche, presently the border of Aguascalientes and Zacatecas; the presidio at Palmillas, which was located near what is now Tepezalá; and the Ciénega Grande presidio, established around 1570. The latter was located on what are now Moctezuma and Victoria Streets, although some historians place it on the Calle 5 de Mayo (once the Camino Real) at Moctezuma, just in front of the Plaza de Armas. This was a fortress whose purpose was the protection of the Valle de los Romero and the road to Zacatecas, entering this way to secure the passage of convoys loaded with silver and other metals.

The founding of Aguascalientes as a town came from the order that King Felipe II gave the judge of the court of Nueva Galicia, Don Gerónimo de Orozco, in which he stated that he should look for a rich man to settle in the territory with the purpose of expelling the Chichimecas and of assuring safe passage. Gerónimo de Orozco, following that order, looked for someone who would accept the king's order and found a man named Juan de Montoro in the city of Santa María de los Lagos. He accepted the assignment and, accompanied by eleven other people, headed to the territory and thus founded the town of Aguas Calientes on October 22, 1575.   It has been noted that it was called San Marcos originally, changing its name on August 18, 1611, to the Villa of Our Lady of the Assumption of Aguas Calientes. And finally, from June 2, 1875, it was called the Villa of Our Lady of the Assumption of Aguas Calientes; later changing to the city of Aguascalientes, which remains its name today.

In the act of its establishment, the Villa de San Marcos (Aguascalientes) was awarded the highest mayoral jurisdiction under the Kingdom of New Galicia.   As of December 4, 1786, on the occasion of the issuance of the "Ordinance of Mayors," it became a quartermaster sub-delegation.

On April 24, 1789, by order of the Superior Board of Royal Property, the sub-delegation of Aguascalientes became a dependency of Zacatecas.

In the Mexican War of Independence, in the territory which is today the state of Aguascalientes, the fires of independence were stoked by illustrious and courageous men such as Valentin Gómez Farías, Rafael Iriarte, Rafael Vázquez, and Pedro Parga.

Confusion has arisen regarding the exact date when Aguascalientes formally separated from the territory of Zacatecas.  By virtue of having, de facto, defeated the liberal government of Zacatecas by rising against the central government, president Antonio López de Santa Anna passed through Aguascalientes, where he was well received by the people who had wanted to separate from Zacatecas for some time. Taking advantage of the independent souls of the Aguascalentenses, and by way of punishing Zacatecas for supporting the Revolution against them, by Federal Decree of General López de Santa Anna dated May 23, 1835, in the third article; ordered that Aguascalientes to be separated from Zacatecas territory, without granting the territory any specific category, reinstating the appointment of the political boss, Pedro Garcia Rojas.   With respect to this, it must be mentioned that said order was not made official as it did not meet the legal requirements to take effect, since it was necessary that two thirds of each house, both Senators and Representatives, approved the order; furthermore it would be required that two thirds of the legislatures of the states also approved it. The second requirement not being completed, the constitutional congress convened again to develop the centralized constitution that would be known later as the Seven Laws.   The constitution did not acknowledge Aguascalientes in the rank of department, but it saw fit to eliminate the states, together with the federal regime, replacing the states with departments, and because of this it continued to belong to Zacatecas.   What can be said, since in the local constitution of Zacatecas of 1825, Aguascalientes was contemplated as a member of said state.

It was general José Mariano Salas who, on August 5, 1846, announced the reestablishment of federalism, convening a constitutional congress that declared current the constitution of 1824, but still didn't consider Aguascalientes as a state. Subsequently, on May 18, 1847, amendments were approved to the Constitution of 1824, but neither granted to Aguascalientes the status of a state.   That brought about a war between Aguascalientes and Zacatecas, and as a consequence Zacatecas would strengthen the partitions, now municipalities, of Cavillo and Rincón de Romos.   In July 1848, Aguascalientes accepted the peaceful annexation to Zacatecas; but continued making efforts to separate through Miguel García Rojas.   It was not until December 10, 1853, that López de Santa Anna, using his extraordinary powers, issued a decree declaring Aguascalientes a department, based on the decrees of December 30, 1836, and June 30, 1838, without ever referring to the one from March 23, 1835. Finally, in the project that would be the Constitution of 1857, that was presented on June 16, 1856, Aguascalientes was included as a state in Article 43; it was passed unanimously by the 79 deputies present, ensuring the establishment of the state of Aguascalientes on December 10, 1856. On September 16, 1857, on the strength of said constitution, Lic. Jesús Terán Peredo reclaimed his post as constitutional governor of the state.

In the independent state, hidrocálidos (people of Aguascalientes) Jesús R. Macías, Manuel Rangel, Augustín Orona, José María Arellano and many other anonymous heroes distinguished themselves in the War of Reform.

Silvestre Dorador, Román Morales, Pedro Vital, Alfonso Guerrero Aguilera and Alberto Fuentes Dávila were forerunners of the Revolution. The explosion of the Maderist movement embraced the cause in the company of some other compatriots, and the rebel action of the town and the region stayed formalized.

Geography

Most of its inhabitants live in the densely populated metropolitan area of its capital city.

The state as it is now was created on October 27, 1857, when it was separated from Zacatecas after the tale says that the wife of the governor of the state promised to give a kiss to the President of the time, in exchange for the separation of Aguascalientes from Zacatecas, which explains the shape of a kiss the state has. It bears the name Aguascalientes taken from its largest city and capital also called Aguascalientes.

Climate
The state mostly has a semi-arid climate, except in the southeastern and northeastern parts where the climate is wetter and cooler. In these months, temperatures can exceed . Frosts frequently occur from November to February. Mean rainfall is low, averaging  and is mostly concentrated in summer with winters being dry.

Government and politics

Government

Aguascalientes is subdivided into 11 municipios ("municipalities").

Demographics

Economy and industry

This state originated around the times of colonial Spanish influence. It is located in the middle of the country and is now beginning to make a name for itself as an industrial power within Mexico. The state was once a major silver miner and a major source of railroad transportation, the latter due to its strategic location, midway between the three most populous areas, namely Mexico City, Guadalajara, and Monterrey.

Today, Mexico's fast growing car industry is especially important in this state. There are  two Nissan factories in Aguascalientes which together produce more than half a million cars per year.  Infiniti may build a plant to make vehicles like the QX30.

In the rural area, Aguascalientes was once the largest national producer of grapes and wines. This tradition ceased gradually due to the Spanish Royalty's wishes that grape and wine production be limited to the mother country. Thanks to the influx of immigrants into Mexico, the wineries and vineyards remain and flourish. Guavas are also produced in the state, specifically in the municipality of Calvillo. This county is one of the richest counties in Aguascalientes.

There are several projects for economic development such as: the Financial District Río San Pedro, a monorail, a suburban train, the construction of the newest and most modern WTC in Mexico, over four shopping malls, two theme parks, two Executive Hotels and one whose qualification is five stars, eight bridges for the next five years, a Financial District around the Airport, A Texas Instruments Assembly-Test Plant, A Nissan Assembly plant,  a Toyota assembly plant and several others projects place Aguascalientes as the third most competitive state in Mexico with more than US$12,000,000 in foreign direct investment per year (around 8 percent of Mexico's FDI) even though its population is just about 1.03 percent of the country.

However, recently it has also benefited from heavier tourism, since the capital city has gained prestige and status as a national destination for its colonial beauty and cleanliness. In addition, the haciendas and baths around the state have historic and recreational importance.

Tourism

Although this state is not often billed as a tourist center, international visitors, as well as citizens from all over Mexico, are attracted to San Marcos Fair, which is considered the national fair of Mexico and contributes much to Mexico's economy.

Recently, its capital city has gained the reputation as a great destination for its superb colonial architecture visible in the colonial center, as well as the modernity and dynamism in the outskirts.

The city is home to Lic. Jesús Terán Peredo International Airport, where 9 flights per day depart to Mexico City, Tijuana, Dallas/Fort Worth and Houston.

The city also hosts many conventions every year. It benefits from its excellent central location. The city is also famed for its environment of relaxation, and for its safety and cleanliness, as it is often described by people when traveling to this part of the country for conventions or tourism.

Most tourists go to the capital. A few tourists explore the former mining towns in the north of the state (in the municipalities of Asientos and Tepezalá), which are now almost ghost cities. The haciendas, hot springs, and baths scattered around the state are also of historical and recreational relevance.

The municipality of Calvillo has a humid subtropical climate, The largest producer of guavas in Mexico, it attracts some fans of watersports to its reservoirs.

The state has a Natural Protected Reserve in the higher mountains called Sierra Fría. Its attractions include observing exuberant landscape and wide ravines, in which, there are pumas, lynxes, boar, white-tailed deer, wild turkey, raccoons and many other animals. There are steep-sided cycle paths, camping and picnic areas as well as several hunting clubs. It is the mountain climate and fauna that attracts locals for camping activities. In winter, the temperature sometimes falls to  when the weather is poor. Usually, Sierra Fría is the only part of the state that gets snow during winter.

In the city of Aguascalientes one of the best sunsets in the world can be seen in Cerro del Muerto; the hill resembles the shape of a man lying down. The city of Aguascalientes is called "el corazón" which means "the heart" of Mexico because it lies in the middle of the country. This city is often considered, by its locals, to be one of the safest and cleanest in Mexico. Also, the city of Aguascalientes is known as "the land of the good people".

Sports

Club de Fútbol Gallos Hidrocálidos de Aguascalientes was a football club from Aguascalientes, Mexico.

The club was founded in 1994, when Salvador López Monroy, a restaurant business owner from Los Angeles, bought a second division franchise which he relocated to Aguascalientes where there was no professional football club.

The club played its last tournament in 2000-2001 when the Governor of Aguascalientes bought first division club Necaxa, with its national following, and relocated it from Mexico City. Gallos de Aguascalientes was then sold to Chivas, which changed its name to F.C. Tapatio de Guadalajara, affiliated to Chivas.

The city is home to the soccer team Club Necaxa, which plays in Mexican first division. The club left Mexico City and relocated to Aguascalientes following the 2003 opening of Estadio Victoria, which is now the club's home venue and one of the best stadiums in the country.

The state has one football team in the Mexican Premiere League, Club Necaxa, one professional baseball team  in the Mexican League, Rieleros de Aguascalientes (The railroad men), and one professional basketball team, Panteras de Aguascalientes (Aguascalientes Panthers)

In December 2009, Necaxa was represented on the field and played their final 2009 match within the Primera División (First Division) tier in the 2009 season after losing 1-0 vs Club América. Under the rules of regulation, Necaxa would not be able to participate in the First Division competition play in the fall 2009 and spring 2010 year.

Necaxa's closing spring 2010 league performance had some accomplishments. They had an undefeated record at home throughout the fall 2009. In the spring 2010 campaign, Necaxa's only loss in the season came against F.C León, Necaxa faced this other soccer team on May 8, 2010 for the second leg of the Bicentennial Closing Spring Tournament of 2010. Necaxa won 4-2 on aggregate. Necaxa abandoned the Liga de Ascenso and returned to First Division fall 2010 season. As a result of this match Necaxa won the bi-championship in the Liga de Ascenso and First Promotion title in their franchise history.

On April 16, 2011, after a draw 1–1 with Atlante F.C., the club's first key game in 2011, Necaxa could not cumulate enough points in order to evade relegation. For a second time, Club Necaxa was relegated to the Liga de Ascenso, the second tier, for the 2011–2012 season. One of the biggest soccer to live Judith Ramírez played for this team from 2001–2017.

Basketball
Aguascalientes hosts the Panteras de Aguascalientes headquarters. This team plays in the Mexican Professional Basketball League.

Baseball
Aguascalientes also hosts the baseball professional team Rieleros.

Racing
Aguascalientes also has important racetracks for the car and motorbike races at a national and international level.

Media
Newspapers of Aguascalientes include: Ahí, El Heraldo de Aguascalientes, El Sol del Centro de Aguascalientes, Hidrocálido, La Jornada Aguascalientes, and Picacho Panorama de Aguascalientes.

Major communities

Aguascalientes
Asientos
Calvillo
Cosio
Jesús María

Pabellón de Arteaga
Rincón de Romos
San Francisco de los Romo
San Jose de Gracia
Tepezala

Notable people
See also articles in the category People from Aguascalientes
José María Bocanegra, third President of Mexico
Yadhira Carrillo, Actress
Jesús Fructuoso Contreras, Artist
Sebastián Córdova, Mexican soccer player who plays for Liga MX club Club América
Wendolly Esparza, American-born Mexican television personality best known for winning Miss Mexico 2014.
Anabel Ferreira, Actress/Comedian
Karina González, Model and Nuestra Belleza México 2011
Saturnino Herrán, Artist
Luis Gerardo Méndez, Mexican Actor
Jose Maria Napoleón, Singer and composer
Gabriela Palacio, model and Nuestra Belleza Mundo México 2010.
Manuel M. Ponce, Musician
José Guadalupe Posada, Artist
Violeta Retamoza, Professional golfer
David Reynoso, Actor
Armida Vendrell, Actress, dancer, and vaudevillian
William Yarbrough, Mexican-born American soccer player

References

External links 

—Estado de Aguascalientes — state government website.
Aravelaguascalientes.com: Aguascalientes tourism website
Flickr: photo set of the City of Aguascalientes — in Aguascalientes state.
Fotos y Mensajes de Aguascalientes

 
States of Mexico
Mexican Plateau states
States and territories established in 1835
1835 establishments in Mexico
Articles which contain graphical timelines